Jushi may refer to:

 Jushi Kingdom, in modern Turpan, Xinjiang, China
 Householder (Buddhism) or jushi (居士)
 Jushi Mataza Tsumuji, a character in the manga series Tenjho Tenge